Mecistogaster lineari, or the Giant Helicopter Damselfly is a species of narrow-winged damselfly in the family Coenagrionidae. It is found in South America.

Subspecies
These two subspecies belong to the species Mecistogaster linearis:
 Mecistogaster linearis infumata Fraser, 1946
 Mecistogaster linearis linearis (Fabricius, 1777)

References

Further reading

 

Coenagrionidae
Articles created by Qbugbot
Insects described in 1777